Ryan is a city in Delaware County, Iowa, United States. The population was 350 at the time of the 2020 census.

Geography
Ryan is located at  (42.350648, -91.482986).

History
Ryan was platted by Arthur I. Flint, J. A. Thomas, and Andrew E. Anderson on August 28, 1888. The city was incorporated in 1901.

On August 12, 1974, an F4 tornado swept through Ryan, destroying much of the southern part of the community, and injuring 12. The tornado severely damaged homes as well as Great Plains Lumber Company, St. Patrick's Catholic Church, and the West Delaware grade school. It was estimated that the tornado caused $2.5 million in damage.

Demographics

2010 census
As of the census of 2010, there were 361 people, 152 households, and 93 families living in the city. The racial makeup of the city was 99.2% White and 0.8% from two or more races.

There were 152 households, of which 28.9% had children under the age of 18 living with them, 52.6% were married couples living together, 4.6% had a female householder with no husband present, 3.9% had a male householder with no wife present, and 38.8% were non-families. 32.9% of all households were made up of individuals, and 13.2% had someone living alone who was 65 years of age or older. The average household size was 2.38 and the average family size was 3.10.

The median age in the city was 37.9 years. 23.3% of residents were under the age of 18; 6.6% were between the ages of 18 and 24; 26.6% were from 25 to 44; 30.5% were from 45 to 64; and 13% were 65 years of age or older. The gender makeup of the city was 51.8% male and 48.2% female.

2000 census
At the 2000 census, there were 410 people, 158 households and 97 families living in the city. The racial makeup of the city was 98.78% White, 0.73% from other races, and 0.49% from two or more races. Hispanic or Latino of any race were 0.73% of the population.

There were 158 households, of which 35.4% had children under the age of 18 living with them, 53.8% were married couples living together, 5.1% had a female householder with no husband present, and 38.0% were non-families. 32.9% of all households were made up of individuals, and 15.8% had someone living alone who was 65 years of age or older. The average household size was 2.59 and the average family size was 3.47.

32.2% of the population were under the age of 18, 6.8% from 18 to 24, 30.0% from 25 to 44, 18.5% from 45 to 64, and 12.4% who were 65 years of age or older. The median age was 33 years. For every 100 females, there were 104.0 males. For every 100 females age 18 and over, there were 104.4 males.

The median household income was $34,250 and the median family incomewas $42,813. Males had a median income of $30,250 versus $21,417 for females. The per capita income for the city was $14,576. About 7.5% of families and 8.7% of the population were below the poverty line, including 9.6% of those under age 18 and 6.1% of those age 65 or over.

Education
The West Delaware County Community School District operates local area public schools.

Notable Sites
Happy Chef Umpire Roadside America

References

Cities in Delaware County, Iowa
Cities in Iowa